Ernici may refer to
 The Hernici, an ancient people of Italy
 The Monti Ernici, a mountain range forming part of the Italian Apennines